Ota Čermák (1919–1963) was a Czech organist (Hammond organ) and composer of easy listening music. He recorded numerous songs on the national Czechoslovakian label Supraphon and sometimes for foreign labels (e.g. Romania's Electrecord).

He was born on 10 April 1919, in Kladno County, Kročehlavy, and died on 21 August 1963 in a car crash near Čáslav.

His most success 
Record data
Riccardo Eugenio Drigo: Serenade (Les Millions d'Arlequin) Harlekýnovy Milióny
Ethelbert Woodbridge Nevin: Narcissus (Water Scenes)
Ernst Fischer: Terrasse am Meer (Südlich der Alpen) Terasa nad mořem (Jížně od Alp)
Sebatian Yradier: La Paloma

Other records 
Jan Hála: Ukolébavka (Lullaby)

Husím Pochodem (Geese)

Federico Garcia Lorca, Jan Seidel: Lola

Antonín Jedlicka: Vzpomínky

Jaroslav Křička: Bábinčin maršovský valčík (from the opera Ogaři)

Rafael Hernandez: Cachita

Bedrich Nikodem, Jaromír Horec: Sedmikráska (Bellis perennis, "eye of the day")

Jaroslav Ježek: Melodia Jaroslava Ježka

Bohuslav Nádvorník, R. A. Dvorský, Saša Grossmann: Polibek

Gustav Langer: Babička (Mom)

Joseph Haydn, Anne Hunter: Sjezdovka Solisko

Oskar Schima, Jiří Strnad: Maminko, kup mi koníčka ("Mamma buy me a horse", sung by Oldřich Kovář)

Ota Čermák: Dědečkovy hodiny

Ota Čermák: Alfa lipsi (Dance is my Life)

Alfons Jindra, R. A. Dvorský, Vladimír Dvořák: Cesta domů (Homewards)

Johnny Heykens: Zastaveníčko (Serenade)

Jan Sibelius: Valse Triste

Ota Čermák: Perníková Polka

Jaroslav Dudek: Dešťové Kapky (Raindrops) Supraphon SUED 1013

Robert Schumann: Snění (Kinderscenen, Träumerei)

Christina Rosettiová, Jan Seidel: Až umru, můj miláčku

Richard Wagner: Svatební Pochod Ke Hre W. Shakespeara Sen Noci Svatojánské (A Midsummer Night's Dream)

Tatranské pastorale

Ota Čermák: Mountain pastorale – Gingerbread polka, Mistletoe Supraphon SUED 1014

Nocturno

Discography,
other list

Disks for home edition labelled in Czech; for export, labelled in English

Remarks

References 

1919 births
1963 deaths
Czech organists
Male organists
Czech composers
Czech male composers
20th-century composers
20th-century organists
20th-century Czech male musicians
Czechoslovak musicians